Edmond Marcus Wilson (born April 16, 1968) is a former American football running back who played five seasons in the National Football League with the Los Angeles Raiders and Green Bay Packers. He was drafted by the Los Angeles Raiders in the sixth round of the 1990 NFL Draft. He played college football at the University of Virginia and attended Greece Olympia High School in Rochester, New York.

References

External links
Just Sports Stats
College stats

Living people
1968 births
Players of American football from New York (state)
American football running backs
African-American players of American football
Virginia Cavaliers football players
Los Angeles Raiders players
Green Bay Packers players
Sportspeople from Rochester, New York
21st-century African-American people
20th-century African-American sportspeople